Friedrich Kluge (21 June 1856 – 21 May 1926) was a German philologist and educator. He is known for the Kluge etymological dictionary of the German language (Etymologisches Wörterbuch der deutschen Sprache), which was first published in 1883.

Biography 
Kluge was born in Cologne. He studied comparative linguistics and classical and modern philologies at the universities of Leipzig, Strasbourg and Freiburg. As a student, his instructors were August Leskien, Georg Curtius, Friedrich Zarncke and Rudolf Hildebrand at Leipzig and Heinrich Hübschmann, Bernhard ten Brink and Erich Schmidt at the University of Strasbourg.

He became a teacher of English and German philology at Strassburg (1880), an assistant professor of German at the University of Jena in 1884, a full professor in 1886, and in 1893 was appointed professor of German language and literature at Freiburg as a successor to Hermann Paul.

A Proto-Germanic sound law that he formulated in a paper in 1884 is now known as Kluge's law.

He died in Freiburg.

Works

 Etymologisches Wörterbuch der deutschen Sprache (1881; 10th edition, 1924; 25th edition, 2011).
 Stammbildungslehre der altgermanischen Dialekte (2d edition, 1899).
 Von Luther bis Lessing, sprachgeschichtliche Aufsätze (4th edition, 1904).
 Angelsächsisches Lesebuch (3d edition, 1902).
 Deutsche Studentensprache (1895).
 English Etymology, in collaboration with Frederick Lutz (1898).
 Rothwelsch, Quellen und Wortschatz der Gaunersprache (1901).
 Mittelenglisches Lesebuch, glossary by Arthur Kölbing (1904; 2d edition, 1912).
For Hermann Paul's "Grundriss der germanischen Philologie" he wrote "Vorgeschichte der altgermanischen Dialekte" (1897) and "Geschichte der englischen Sprache" (1899). In 1900 he founded the journal "Zeitschrift für deutsche Wortforschung".

See also

 Karl Müllenhoff
 Jan de Vries

Notes

References 
Portraits of Linguists and their studies in the area of the Old Germanic Languages

1856 births
1926 deaths
Writers from Cologne
German lexicographers
Etymologists
German philologists
Academic staff of the University of Jena
Academic staff of the University of Freiburg
German male non-fiction writers